Clément Yvan Landry Bayiha (born March 8, 1999) is a Canadian soccer player who plays for York United of the Canadian Premier League.

Club career
Bayiha signed with the Ottawa Fury on July 24, 2018, and was immediately loaned to the Montreal Impact on a short-term deal lasting a few days. He made his professional debut with the Fury a month later on August 22 against Bethlehem Steel. After the 2018 season, the Fury would announce that Bayiha would not return to the squad for the 2019 season.

On November 16, 2018, Bayiha signed a homegrown contract with the Montreal Impact (later renamed CF Montréal). Bayiha would have his option for the 2020 season exercised by the Impact, keeping him with the club for 2020. After the 2021 season, CF Montreal would announce that they would not exercise the option on Bayiha's contract, ending his time with the club after three seasons.

In January 2022 Bayiha joined HamKam of Norway. At the end of the season, he departed the club.

In January 2023 Canadian Premier League side York United announced they had signed Bayiha to a deal.

International career
In 2017, he was called up to a Quebec-Canada U20 team to play friendlies against Haiti U20, who were preparing for the 2017 Jeux de la Francophonie.

Bayiha was called up to the Canadian U21 team for the 2018 Toulon Tournament in May 2018, and the U20 team for the 2018 CONCACAF U-20 Championship in October 2018. Bayiha was named to the Canadian U-23 provisional roster for the 2020 CONCACAF Men's Olympic Qualifying Championship on February 26, 2020.

Career statistics

Club

Honours

Club

Montreal Impact
 Canadian Championship: 2019

Notes

References

External links

 

1999 births
Living people
Footballers from Yaoundé
People from Sainte-Thérèse, Quebec
Soccer people from Quebec
Cameroonian emigrants to Canada
Canadian soccer players
Canada men's youth international soccer players
Association football defenders
A.S. Blainville players
Ottawa Fury FC players
CF Montréal players
Hamarkameratene players
York United FC players
USL Championship players
Major League Soccer players
Homegrown Players (MLS)
Eliteserien players
Canadian expatriate soccer players
Expatriate footballers in Norway
Canadian expatriate sportspeople in Norway